County Hospital may refer to:

 County Hospital, Torfaen, Wales
 County Hospital, Durham, England
 County Hospital, Stafford, England
 County Hospital (film), a 1932 Laurel and Hardy short film
 County Hospital, Ghana